Apurimac III: Nature – Spirit – Pride is an album by the German cross-cultural new-age band Cusco, released in 1997. The album peaked at #7 on the Billboard Top New Age Albums chart.

All tracks on this album are related to the Native American cultures of North America. The beats, chants, and flute works depict a Native American musical style, though are made more accessible to modern ears through the use of overtly synthesized instrumentation and percussive rhythms.

Track listing
All songs written by Michael Holm and Kristian Schultze except where indicated.

 "Ghost Dance" (traditional)
 "Kokopelli's Dream" (featuring Craig Chaquico)
 "Geronimo's Laughter"
 "Medicine Man"
 "Little Pigeon and Crazy Horse"
 "Pahrump — Big Water" (Holm)
 "Dream Catcher"
 "Legend in the Redwoods" (Schultze)
 "The Hunt"
 "White Buffalo" (Holm)

Album credits
  Kristian Schultze — Arranger, programming 
  Maria Ehrenreich — Director, production director
  Dan Selene — Executive producer
  Michael Holm — Arranger, producer, mixing  
  Frank Von Dem Bottlenburg — Engineer, mixing  
  Giuseppe Solera — Flute  
  Murry Whiteman — Paintings, photography
  Johan Daansen — Acoustic guitar
  Debra Holland — Liner notes 
  Craig Chaquico — Guitar, performer  
  William Aura — Digital assembly, digital mastering
  Matt Marshall — Executive producer

References

External links 
Apurimac III at MP3.com

1997 albums
Cusco (band) albums